Marvin Gaye and Tammi Terrell's Greatest Hits is a 1970 compilation album released by Motown stars Marvin Gaye and Tammi Terrell on the Tamla label. It is a collection of the duo's recording material, penned and produced by the songwriting-producing team of Ashford & Simpson except for two tracks. The album was released shortly after the death of Terrell, who died of a brain tumor at the age of 24.

Track listing
All of the tracks were written and produced by Nickolas Ashford & Valerie Simpson unless noted.

"Your Precious Love" (3:02)
"Ain't No Mountain High Enough" (2:27)
"You're All I Need to Get By" (2:48)
"Ain't Nothing Like the Real Thing" (2:13)
"Good Lovin' Ain't Easy to Come By" (2:27)
"If This World Were Mine" (Marvin Gaye) (2:41)
"The Onion Song" (2:56)
"If I Could Build My Whole World Around You" (Johnny Bristol/Vernon Bullock/Harvey Fuqua) (2:20)
"Keep On Lovin' Me Honey" (2:29)
"What You Gave Me" (2:42)
"You Ain't Livin' Till You're Lovin'" (2:26)
"Hold Me Oh My Darling" (Fuqua) (2:44)

References

1970 greatest hits albums
Tammi Terrell albums
Albums produced by Johnny Bristol
Albums produced by Harvey Fuqua
Marvin Gaye compilation albums
Tamla Records compilation albums
Albums produced by Ashford & Simpson
Albums produced by Marvin Gaye